Amatzia is a moshav in south-central Israel. Located around 8 km southeast of Lakhish, it falls under the jurisdiction of Lakhish Regional Council.

History
The moshav was founded in 1955, and is located on the land of the depopulated Palestinian village of Al-Dawayima, the scene of the 1948 Al-Dawayima massacre.

It was named for King Amaziah of Judah, who, according to the Book of Kings, was killed in the Lakhish region. In the past the community was a moshav shitufi but it has undergone a process of privatization and abandoned its collective nature.

In 2006, temporary housing was built in the area of the moshav to absorb evacuees from Katif who lived in Gush Katif until they were evacuated under Israel's unilateral disengagement plan.

References

External links

Amatzia in Lakhish Regional Council web site .
Map of Amatzia .
Aerial photograph of Amatzia.

Moshavim
Populated places established in 1955
Populated places in Southern District (Israel)
1955 establishments in Israel